JAH Message is an album by The Wailers Band released in 1994.

Track listing
 Where Is Love
 Know Thyself
 Rasta
 My Redemption
 Miracle
 Jah Love
 Wrong Tree
 Rastaman Sound
 Many Roads To Zion
 Kick The Habit
 Heroes
 All Day All Night

The Wailers Band albums
1994 albums